Mary Lincoln may refer to:

Mary Lincoln Crume (1775–c. 1832), daughter of Abraham Lincoln (Captain) and Bathsheba Herring and aunt of American President Abraham Lincoln
Mary Todd Lincoln (1818–1882), wife of American President Abraham Lincoln
Mary Johnson Bailey Lincoln (1844–1921), American science teacher
Mary Harlan Lincoln (1846–1937), daughter of James Harlan, wife of Robert T. Lincoln, daughter-in-law of Abraham Lincoln
Mary "Mamie" Lincoln (1869–1938), granddaughter of Abraham Lincoln
Mary Lincoln Beckwith (1898–1975), prominent descendant of Abraham Lincoln